Leland Kitteridge "Hago" Harrington (October 13, 1903 in Melrose, Massachusetts – July 1, 1959) was an American professional ice hockey forward who played 66 games in the National Hockey League for the Boston Bruins and Montreal Canadiens between 1925 and 1933.

Harrington scored his first NHL goal as a member of the Boston Bruins. It occurred on December 29, 1925 in Boston's 3-0 home victory over the Toronto St. Patricks. Harrington was the first Massachusett's born player on the Bruins to score his first NHL goal in his first NHL game.

Harrington built and opened a miniature golf course in Stoneham, Massachusetts that still operates as "Hago Harrington's Miniature Golf" today.

Career statistics

Regular season and playoffs

References

External links

1903 births
1959 deaths
American men's ice hockey forwards
Boston Athletic Association ice hockey players
Boston Bruins players
Ice hockey players from Massachusetts
Montreal Canadiens players
New Haven Eagles players
People from Melrose, Massachusetts
Providence Reds players
Sportspeople from Middlesex County, Massachusetts